Eligio "Kika" de la Garza II (September 22, 1927March 13, 2017) was an American politician who served as the Democratic representative for the 15th congressional district of Texas from January 3, 1965, to January 3, 1997.

Biography

De la Garza was born on September 22, 1927 and grew up in Mission in Hidalgo County. At the age of seventeen, he entered the United States Navy and served for two years. De la Garza chose to continue his education at Edinburg Junior College and the United States Army Artillery School at Fort Sill in Oklahoma. For two years beginning in 1952, he was a lieutenant in the Army serving in the 37th Field Artillery Regiment and deployed in the Korean War. After returning home, he completed his law degree at St. Mary's University School of Law in San Antonio. After having practiced law for several years in the Rio Grande Valley, he was elected to the Texas House of Representatives, where he served from 1953 to 1965.

While in the state House, de la Garza was famous for sponsoring a large amount of legislation in the fields of education and the environment. He authored bills to protect wetlands, create state-sponsored preschools, and more international bridges to Mexico. From 1955 to 1957, he was the only Hispanic member of the Texas House. He was joined in 1957 by a second Mexican American member, Oscar M. Laurel of Laredo, the seat of Webb County.

In 1964, de la Garza, a strong supporter of U.S. President Lyndon B. Johnson, ran for United States House of Representatives and won a seat representing South Texas. From 1981 to 1994, he was the chairman of the Agriculture Committee, leading the way in passing bills that reorganized the agricultural lending system, the farm insurance system, the United States Department of Agriculture, and pesticide laws.

De la Garza voted in favor of the Voting Rights Act of 1965, the Civil Rights Act of 1968, and called for smoother relations between the U.S. and Mexico. He worked to improve trade between the two nations and was critical in passing the legislation that enacted the North American Free Trade Agreement (NAFTA).

Death and legacy 
De la Garza retired from public service in 1997. Upon his return home to Texas, he donated his entire Congressional archive to the University of Texas Rio Grande Valley legacy institution UT Pan American.  Currently, the collection is housed at the UTRGV Edinburg Campus library.  The archive was unveiled publicly in 2012.

He resided in McAllen, Texas, with his wife Lucille until his death on March 13, 2017, of kidney failure. He is buried at the Valley Memorial Gardens in McAllen, Texas.

See also 
List of Hispanic and Latino Americans in the United States Congress

References

External links
 Congressman de la Garza's Congressional Papers at The University of Texas Rio Grande Valley
 Digitized files from Congressman de la Garza's Congressional Papers
 Eligio de la Garza - Legislative Reference Library of Texas

|-

|-

|-

1927 births
2017 deaths
20th-century American politicians
American politicians of Mexican descent
United States Army personnel of the Korean War
Deaths from kidney failure
Democratic Party members of the United States House of Representatives from Texas
Hispanic and Latino American members of the United States Congress
Hispanic and Latino American state legislators in Texas
Democratic Party members of the Texas House of Representatives
Military personnel from Texas
People from McAllen, Texas
People from Mission, Texas
St. Mary's University School of Law alumni
United States Army officers
United States Navy sailors
People from Mercedes, Texas